The 2001 World Table Tennis Championships men's singles was the 46th edition of the men's singles championship. 

Wang Liqin defeated Kong Linghui in the final, winning three sets to two to secure the title.

Results

See also
List of World Table Tennis Championships medalists

References

-